The 2023 Pacific FC season is the fifth season in the history of Pacific FC. In addition to the Canadian Premier League, the club will compete in the Canadian Championship.

Current squad

Transfers

In

Draft picks 
Pacific FC selected the following players in the 2023 CPL–U Sports Draft. Draft picks are not automatically signed to the team roster. Only those who are signed to a contract will be listed as transfers in.

Out

Competitions

Pre-season friendlies

Canadian Premier League

Standings

Results by match

Matches

Canadian Championship

References

External links 
Official Site

2023
2023 Canadian Premier League
Canadian soccer clubs 2023 season